The sixth series of the BBC family sitcom My Family originally aired between 10 March 2006 and 25 December 2006. The series was commissioned following consistently high ratings from the previous series. The opening episode, "Bliss For Idiots", re-introduces the six main characters, with the addition of Alfie Butts, played by Rhodri Meilir. All episodes from the sixth series are thirty minutes long, excluding The series was once again produced by Rude Boy Productions, a company that produces comedies created by Fred Barron. The series was filmed at Pinewood Studios in London, in front of a live audience.

Episode Information

Reception

Viewers
The series was once again given a Friday evening prime-time slot, with most episodes being aired at 8:30pm. The opening episode of the series gained 7.17 million viewers, becoming the second most watched programme of the week. The sixth series averaged 6.35 million viewers for each episode.

References

External links
My Family: Series Six at the British Comedy Guide
My Family: Series Six at My Family Online
BBC Comedy- My Family Series 6

2006 British television seasons